Acrolophus niveipunctata is a moth of the family Acrolophidae. It is found on Cuba.

References

Moths described in 1891
niveipunctata